Bothropoma ponsonbyi is a species of sea snail, a marine gastropod mollusk in the family Colloniidae.

Description
The shell grows to a size of 7 mm.

Distribution
This marine species occurs off Northeast Cape to Durban, South Africa

References

External links
 

Colloniidae
Gastropods described in 1897